Selma is a city in Fresno County, California. The population was 23,319 at the 2010 census, up from 19,240 at the 2000 census.

Geography

Demographics

2010
At the 2010 census Selma had a population of 23,219. The racial makeup of Selma was 12,869 (55.4%) White, 284 (1.2%) African American, 479 (2.1%) Native American, 1,057 (4.6%) Asian, 9 (0.0%) Pacific Islander, 7,630 (32.9%) from other races, and 891 (3.8%) from two or more races. Hispanic or Latino of any race were 18,014 persons (77.6%).

The census reported that 23,054 people (99.3% of the population) lived in households, 50 (0.2%) lived in non-institutionalized group quarters, and 115 (0.5%) were institutionalized.

There were 6,416 households, 3,411 (53.2%) had children under the age of 18 living in them, 3,553 (55.4%) were opposite-sex married couples living together, 1,158 (18.0%) had a female householder with no husband present, 560 (8.7%) had a male householder with no wife present.  There were 516 (8.0%) unmarried opposite-sex partnerships, and 27 (0.4%) same-sex married couples or partnerships. 939 households (14.6%) were one person and 481 (7.5%) had someone living alone who was 65 or older. The average household size was 3.59.  There were 5,271 families (82.2% of households); the average family size was 3.89.

The age distribution was 7,442 people (32.1%) under the age of 18, 2,677 people (11.5%) aged 18 to 24, 6,321 people (27.2%) aged 25 to 44, 4,483 people (19.3%) aged 45 to 64, and 2,296 people (9.9%) who were 65 or older.  The median age was 29.5 years. For every 100 females, there were 100.3 males.  For every 100 females age 18 and over, there were 99.8 males.

There were 6,813 housing units at an average density of ,of which 6,416 were occupied, 3,825 (59.6%) by the owners and 2,591 (40.4%) by renters.  The homeowner vacancy rate was 2.4%; the rental vacancy rate was 5.5%.  13,229 people (57.0% of the population) lived in owner-occupied housing units and 9,825 people (42.3%) lived in rental housing units.

2000
As of the census of 2006, there were 23,194 people in 5,596 households, including 4,538 families, in the city. The racial makeup of the city was 43.90% White, 0.75% Black or African American, 1.56% Native American, 3.18% Asian, 0.03% Pacific Islander, 46.09% from other races, and 4.48% from two or more races.  71.75% of the population were Hispanic or Latino of any race.

Of the 5,596 households 45.9% had children under the age of 18 living with them, 57.3% were married couples living together, 17.0% had a female householder with no husband present, and 18.9% were non-families. 15.7% of households were one person and 8.7% were one person aged 65 or older.  The average household size was 3.45 and the average family size was 3.76.

The age distribution was 33.1% under the age of 18, 11.8% from 18 to 24, 28.6% from 25 to 44, 16.2% from 45 to 64, and 10.3% 65 or older.  The median age was 28 years. For every 100 females, there were 100.5 males.  For every 100 females age 18 and over, there were 99.1 males.

The median income for a household in the city was $34,713, and the median family income was $36,510. Males had a median income of $26,966 versus $22,672 for females. The per capita income for the city was $12,834.  About 17.4% of families and 22.7% of the population were below the poverty line, including 31.0% of those under age 18 and 10.9% of those age 65 or over.

History and culture
Selma owes its beginnings to farming and to the Southern Pacific Railroad, which began in the 1870s as a branch line of the Central Pacific Railroad. The route of the Southern Pacific through California's Central Valley gave rise to a string of small towns between Sacramento and Bakersfield. Selma was among them.

In 1880, residents of the rural community that would become Selma established the Valley View School District. The first post office opened in 1880. A decade later, four farmers - Jacob E. Whitson, Egbert H. Tucker, George Otis and Monroe Snyder - formed a partnership and developed a townsite along the railroad. They began auctioning lots and just three years later the city of Selma was formally incorporated.

A persistent local legend is that Selma was named after Selma Gruenberg Lewis (ca. 1867–1944) by Governor Leland Stanford, who was shown her picture by her father. As Lewis first told the story in 1925, Stanford, also a Director of the Central Pacific Railroad, was so taken that he ordered that the next town on the line be named for her. Lewis often repeated the story with further romantic embellishments, and it came to be accepted as fact despite a lack of documentary evidence. Lewis is buried in Floral Memorial Park in Selma, and her marker repeats the story. Subsequent investigation indicates instead that the town was in fact named for Selma Michelsen (1853–1910), wife of a railroad employee who had submitted her name for inclusion on a list of candidate names prepared by his supervisor. George Otis selected the name from this list, in consultation with other local businessmen.

Along with Fowler to its immediate north and Kingsburg to its south, Selma was a railroad stop where agricultural goods could be loaded for shipping. As in the rest of the United States, the railroad played a lesser role as the 20th century progressed. What was once a handsome passenger terminal in the city's downtown became Selma's police station.

In the late 19th century, the town also boasted a water-driven mill for grinding wheat to flour. The mill was powered by the C&K Canal, a seasonal irrigation channel that was known in Selma as the Mill Ditch.

Agribusiness
Wheat growing was Selma's first economic engine but was replaced by orchards and vineyards when farmers realized how well peaches, plums, and grapes grew in the sandy soil, irrigated with snow-melt water imported through canals from the nearby Sierra Nevada mountain range.

Although raisins (sweet grapes preserved by sun-drying) soon became the major crop, Selma called itself the "Home of the Peach" and was also known as "A Peach of a City." Through the 1960s, a major seasonal employer was the local peach cannery, where Libby's brand fruit was packed. Peaches and other tree fruit are still grown in abundance.

With 90 percent of U.S. raisins produced within eight miles of Selma, the city adopted the slogan "Raisin Capital of the World" in 1963. Area vineyards also produce table grapes. A decline in family farming, the national trend in U.S. agriculture after World War II, and depressed prices for raisins and table grapes, especially in the last decades of the twentieth century, were drains on the Selma-area agribusiness economy. Harris Ranch is based in Selma.

Shifting business center
Like many other American cities, Selma suffered a decline in its old downtown in the late decades of the 20th century and into the 21st century. Post–World War II development spread the growing city to the north and east, away from its business center. U.S. Highway 99, once a main road north and south through town, running parallel to the railroad, was rebuilt as a freeway (now SR 99) in the 1960s. Several blocks to the west of the old road (now Whitson Street and Golden State Boulevard), the freeway bisects the oldest residential neighborhood in Selma. Freeway travel made the new shopping malls of Fresno more accessible. The freeway also made Selma more attractive as a place to live for Fresno workers, who contributed to ever-faster residential growth into the 21st century.

The downtown experienced one of its biggest changes when Walmart built a large retail store at the intersection of East Floral Avenue and the freeway—at the northwest edge of town. As the 21st century began, this area became the de facto commercial center of the city providing great economic benefits. The old downtown, despite vacant storefronts, remained a struggling but viable district of city offices and small businesses.

Media
The weekly newspaper is The Selma Enterprise. Residents are served by the daily Fresno Bee and by Fresno-based television and radio stations.

Public schools
The Selma Unified School District has eight neighborhood elementary schools. Students from all of these schools are channeled to Abraham Lincoln Middle School and continue on to Selma High School or two alternative high schools. Selma High School fields a range of sports teams nicknamed The Bears. School colors are orange and black. The yearbook is entitled The Magnet.

Notable people
Well-known people who have lived in and around Selma include 19th-century inventors Frank Dusy, Abijah McCall and William Deidrick; the poets William Everson (Brother Antoninus, 1912–94) and Larry Levis (1946–96); William R. Shockley (1918–1945), recipient of the Congressional Medal of Honor in World War II; author-historian Victor Davis Hanson (1953– ); and Atlanta Braves manager Bobby Cox (1941– ). Clarence Berry (1867–1930), who struck it rich in the Klondike Gold Rush of 1897 and became known as an innovative mining engineer and businessman, had earlier been a fruit farmer in Selma. Also known as C.J. Berry, he left Selma for Canada's Yukon Territory after he was forced to declare bankruptcy. Beatrice Kozera (1920–2013), born Beatrice Rentería, also spent much of her childhood in Selma where her family worked in the fields. In 1947, she met Jack Kerouac who represented her as "The Mexican Girl" in On the Road where Selma is referred to as Sabinal. Frankie A. Rodriguez (1996– ), an actor from the Disney franchise High School Musical: The Musical: The Series, is also from Selma.

References

External links

Incorporated cities and towns in California
Cities in Fresno County, California
Populated places established in 1880
1880 establishments in California